Choline m-bromophenyl ether (MBF) is an extremely potent nicotinic agonist. It has powerful ganglion stimulating effects. It also causes muscle contractions.

References

Nicotinic agonists
Bromoarenes
Phenol ethers
Quaternary ammonium compounds